Arlan B. Meekhof (born November 28, 1959) is an American Republican politician from Michigan formerly serving in the Michigan Senate and as that chamber's majority leader. He previously served two terms in the Michigan House of Representatives.

Arlan Meekhof has been a figure of controversy with the support of tax increases through the May 2015 Michigan proposal 1 tax increase as well as the October 2015 vote for fuel and registration tax/fee increase set to go in place January 2017. He has also led the fight for the purchase of a new senate building.

He endorsed Ohio governor John Kasich for president on September 19, 2015.

References

External links

1959 births
21st-century American politicians
Living people
Republican Party members of the Michigan House of Representatives
Republican Party Michigan state senators
People from Grand Haven, Michigan
People from Ottawa County, Michigan